Fork Church is a historic Episcopal church located near Ashland, Hanover County, Virginia. It was built in 1736, and is a one-story, gable roofed brick building. It measures approximately 34 feet by 74 feet and has walls 22 inches thick.  The front facade features a small
pedimented porch supported on square brick columns, both probably added in the early-19th century.  Also on the property is a contributing church cemetery.  Among the more-notable persons who often attended services at Fork Church were Patrick Henry, Dolley Madison, and the novelist Thomas Nelson Page.  From 1893 to 1903, Fork Church's rector was the Reverend S. S. Hepburn, grandfather of actress Katharine Hepburn.

It was listed on the National Register of Historic Places in 1970.

References

External links
Fork Church, State Route 738, Ashland, Hanover County, VA: 4 photos and 2 data pages at Historic American Buildings Survey

Churches on the National Register of Historic Places in Virginia
Episcopal churches in Virginia
Churches completed in 1736
Churches in Hanover County, Virginia
National Register of Historic Places in Hanover County, Virginia
Historic American Buildings Survey in Virginia
18th-century Episcopal church buildings